Archbishop Stefano Quaranta, C.R. (died 1678) was a Roman Catholic prelate who served as Archbishop of Amalfi (1649–1678).

Biography
Stefano Quaranta was ordained a priest in the Congregation of Clerics Regular of the Divine Providence.
On 21 November 1649, he was appointed during the papacy of Pope Innocent X as Archbishop of Amalfi.
On 30 November 1678, he was consecrated bishop by Marcantonio Franciotti, Cardinal-Priest of Santa Maria della Pace, with Giovanni Battista Rinuccini. Archbishop of Fermo, and Luca Torreggiani, Archbishop of Ravenna, serving as co-consecrators.
He served Archbishop of Amalfi until his death on 30 November 1678.

Episcopal succession
While bishop, he was the principal co-consecrator of:

References

External links and additional sources
 (for Chronology of Bishops) 
 (for Chronology of Bishops)  

17th-century Italian Roman Catholic archbishops
Bishops appointed by Pope Innocent X
1678 deaths
Clergy from Naples
Theatine bishops